The Hartland Swamp Wildlife Management Area is a  wildlife management area (WMA) located in western New York, US. Hartland Swamp WMA is located northeast of Lockport in the Town of Hartland in northeastern Niagara County. It is managed by the New York State Department of Environmental Conservation.

This conservation area is one of the few places for public hunting and trapping in the county.

Geography 
It is several miles north of the larger Tonawanda Wildlife Management Area. The  WMA is partly wetland. 

Hartland Swamp WMA is north of Ridge Road, NY-104. It can be accessed from Hartland Road at its main parking lot. Or also be accessed by road parking on Ditch or Hosmer roads.

Public use
Hunting, fishing, trapping, and bird watching is permitted at Hartland Swamp WMA. Prohibited activities include camping, swimming, and the use of motorized boats and vehicles, including off-road vehicles and snowmobiles.

See also
 List of New York state wildlife management areas

References

External links 
NYS Department of Environmental Conservation: Hartland Swamp Wildlife Management Area
Heartland Swamp WMA map

Wildlife management areas of New York (state)
Protected areas of Niagara County, New York